Chief Frank Ndwakhulu Ravele (1926–1999) was the second President of the bantustan of Venda, which was granted nominal independence from South Africa on 13 September 1979.

Ravele became president on 17 April 1988, after the death of Chief Patrick Mphephu, the first President of Venda; he served in acting capacity until 10 May. Previously, Ravele served in the cabinet as finance minister. When violent strikes and riots broke out in early 1990, he was overthrown on 5 April in a bloodless coup by General Gabriel Ramushwana, then chief of staff of the Venda Defence Force.

References 

1926 births
1999 deaths
Presidents of Venda
Heads of state of Venda
South African Venda people
Leaders ousted by a coup